Allan Alexander "Scotty" Allan, born in Dundee in 1867, who died in 1941, was a Scottish-born American dog musher, businessman and politician.

In 1907, several mushers based in Nome, Alaska, calling themselves the Nome Kennel Club, which promoted the breeding of dog teams and sponsored the All Alaska Sweepstakes race.  The Sweepstakes, whose route goes from Nome to Candle, was organized for the first time in 1908.  With Baldy as his lead dog, Allan reached the podium eight times in the Sweepstakes, including three victories in 1911, 1912 and 1914. His exploits during these races inspired Jack London for the main character of Call of the Wild. He formed a duo with Esther Birdsall Darling mushers a duo and together they ride their own breeding, "Allan Darling and Kennel".

During the course of World War 1, Scotty was contacted by an officer in the French Army who had previously lived in Nome to help him secure 100 lead sled dogs to serve on the front lines in snow-bound regions of France. Scotty procured and escorted the dogs across Canada and the Atlantic Ocean during war time, under threat of sabotage and U-boats. The dogs eventually served in the Vosges area, and earned the Croix De Guerre.

Racing history

See also
 Mushing

References

External links

 A. A. Allen at 100 Years of Alaska's Legislature

1867 births
1941 deaths
Dog mushers from Alaska
Members of the Alaska Territorial Legislature
20th-century American politicians
People from Nome, Alaska
Scottish emigrants to the United States
Sportspeople from Dundee
People from Dundee
Politicians from Dundee